United Brethren may refer to:

Denominations
Apostolic United Brethren, a Mormon fundamentalist group headquartered in Bluffdale, Utah
Church of the United Brethren in Christ, an evangelical Christian denomination based in Huntington, Indiana, organized formally in 1800 and including some but not all churches using United Brethren term previously
Church of the United Brethren in Christ (New Constitution), a historical part of the Church of the United Brethren which eventually became part of the Evangelical United Brethren Church
 Church of the United Brethren in Christ (Old Constitution), a historical part of the Church of the United Brethren
Evangelical United Brethren Church, an American Protestant group formed in 1946
Unitas Fratrum ("United Brethren"), the official name of the Moravian Church
United Brethren (England), a group of former Primitive Methodists who converted to Mormonism en masse in 1840

Specific church buildings
United Brethren in Christ (Ohio), a historic building near Cincinnati, Ohio
United Brethren Publishing House, a historic building in Dayton, Ohio, also known as Centre City Building